Krasny Voskhod is a rural locality (a selo) and the administrative centre of Krasnovoskhodsky Selsoviet, Iglinsky District, Bashkortostan, Russia. The population was 842 as of 2010. There are 13 streets.

Geography 
Krasny Voskhod is located 65 km northeast of Iglino (the district's administrative centre) by road. Novobakayevo is the nearest rural locality.

References 

Rural localities in Iglinsky District